Sterchele is a surname. Notable people with the surname include:

François Sterchele (1982–2008), Belgian footballer
Giorgio Sterchele (born 1970), Italian footballer